Kanukuntla Subhash Chandrabose (Telugu: కనుకుంట్ల సుభాష్ చంద్రబోస్) is an Indian lyricist and playback singer who works in Telugu films. Chandrabose debuted as a lyricist with the 1995 film Taj Mahal. In a career spanning over 25 years, he has written lyrics for about 3600 songs in over 850 films. Chandrabose won an Academy Award and a Golden Globe Award for "Naatu Naatu" song from the film RRR (2022). He has received two Nandi Awards, two Filmfare Awards, and three SIIMA Awards as a lyricist.

Early life and career 
Chandrabose is born in the village of Challagariga of Warangal district, Andhra Pradesh (now in Bhupalpally district, Telangana), where he completed high school. He is the youngest of four siblings, and his father worked as a primary school teacher. He earned a degree in Electrical and Electronics Engineering from Jawaharlal Nehru Technological University, Hyderabad. Early in his career, he tried working as a singer in Doordarshan, without success. He then decided to switch to working as a lyricist.

He entered the film industry with Muppalaneni Shiva's film Taj Mahal (1995). Music director M. M. Srilekha helped him with his first film song, "Manchu Kondallona Chandramaa" in 1995. He adopted Chandrabose as his screen name on the advice of his first director Muppalaneni Siva.

Chandrabose married Suchitra, a choreographer in the Telugu film industry.

Discography 

 Taj Mahal (1995)
 Dharma Chakram (1996)
 Oho Naa Pellanta (1996)
 Pelli Sandadi (1997)
 Master (1997)
 Choodalani Vundi (1998)
 Bavagaru Bagunnara? (1998)
 Premante Idera (1998)
 Iddaru Mitrulu (1999)
 Thammudu (1999)
 Jayam Manade Raa (2000)
 Azad (2000)
 Murari (2000)
 Budget Padmanabham (2001)
 Mrigaraju (2001)
 Manjunatha (2001)
 Kushi (2001)
 Daddy (2001)
 Student No.1 (2001)
 Hanuman Junction (2001)
 Takkari Donga (2002)
 Avunu Valliddaru Ista Paddaru! (2002)
 Aadi (2002)
 Chennakesava Reddy (2002)
 Gangotri (2003)
 Amma Nanna O Tamila Ammayi (2003)
 Dil (2003)
 Johnny (2003)
 Tagore (2003)
 Abhimanyu (2003)
 Lakshmi Narasimha (2004)
 Anji (2004)
 Athade Oka Sainyam (2004)
 Nenunnanu (2004)
 Arya (2004)
 Naani (2004)
 Samba (2004)
 Naa Autograph (2004)
 Gudumba Shankar (2004)
 Sye (2004)
 Shankar Dada MBBS (2004)
 Balu (2005)
 Chakram (2005)
 Subhash Chandra Bose (2005)
 Athanokkade (2005)
 Andarivaadu (2005)
 Andhrudu (2005)
 Allari Bullodu (2005)
 Chatrapathi (2005)
 Bhageeratha (2005)
 Jai Chiranjeeva (2005)
 Happy (2006)
 Ranam (2006)
 Vikramarkudu (2006)
 Bommarillu (2006)
 Sainikudu (2006)
 Khatarnak (2006)
 Annavaram (2006)
 Okka Magaadu (2007)
 Lakshyam (2007)
 Idea Super Singer (2009)
 Magadheera (2009)
 Oye! (2009)
 Bendu Apparao R.M.P (2009)
 Arya 2 (2009)
 Adhurs (2010)
 Simha (2010)
 Komaram Puli (2010)
 Nagavalli (2010)
 100% Love (2011)
 Badrinath (2011)
 Panjaa (2011)
 Shadow (2013)
 Varna (2013, dubbed version)
 Thoofan (2013, bilingual film)
 1: Nenokkadine (2014)
 Manam (2014)
 Alludu Seenu (2014)
 Rey (2016)
 I (2015, dubbed version)
 Mayuri (2015)
 Subramanyam for Sale (2015)
 Tripura (2015)
 Nannaku Prematho (2016)
 Dhruva (2016)
 Nenu Local (2017)
 Jaya Janaki Nayaka (2017)
 Jai Lava Kusa (2017)
 Hello (2017)
 Rangasthalam (2018)
 Nuvvu Thopu Raa (2019)
 Mallesham (2019)
 90ML (2019)
 Sye Raa Narasimha Reddy (2019)
 30 Rojullo Preminchadam Ela (2020)
 Sashi  (2021)
 Kanabadutaledu (2021)
 Devarakondalo Vijay Premakatha (2021)
 Pushpa: The Rise – Part 1 (2021)
 Konda Polam (2021)
 RRR (2022)

Awards and nominations 
Academy Awards
 Academy Award for Best Original Song for Naatu Naatu in RRR (2022)
Critics' Choice Movie Awards
 Critics' Choice Movie Award for Best Song for "Naatu Naatu" in RRR (2022)

Golden Globe Awards

 Golden Globe Award for Best Original Song for "Naatu Naatu" in RRR (2022)
Nandi Awards
 Best Lyricist for "Nee Navvula Thelladanaanni" in Aadi  (2002)
 Best Lyricist for "Cheekatito Veluge Cheppenu Nenunnanani" in Nenunnanu (2004)

Filmfare Awards South
 Best Lyricist - Telugu for "Kanipinchina Maa Amma" in Manam (2014)
 Best Lyricist - Telugu for "Entha Sakkagunnave" in Rangasthalam (2018)
SIIMA Awards
 Best Lyricist – Telugu for "Kanipinchina Maa Amma" from Manam (2014)
 Best Lyricist – Telugu for "Entha Sakkagunnave" from  Rangasthalam (2018)
 Best Lyricist – Telugu for "Srivalli" from Pushpa: The Rise (2022)

Notable songs 
 "Manchu Kondallona Chandramaa" - Taj Mahal (1995)
 "Chai Chatukkuna Tagara Bhai" - Mrugaraju (2001)
 "Evaremi Anukunna" - Budget Padmanabham (2001) 
 "Ekkado Putti Ekkado Perigi" - Student No.1 (2001)
 "Nee Navvula Thelladanaanni" - Aadi (2002)
 "Nuvvu Chudu Chudakapo" - Okato Number Kurradu (2002)
 "Telugu Bhasha Theeyadanam" in Neeku Nenu Naaku Nuvvu (2003)
 "Kodithe Kottali ra Six Kottali" - Tagore (2003)
 "Cheekatito Veluge Cheppenu Nenunnanani" - Nenunnanu (2004)
 "Pedave Palikina" - Naani (2004)
 "Namasthe Namasthe Neeku Namasthe" - Samba (2004)
 "Chiraloni Goppatanam Telusuko" - Pallakilo Pellikuthuru (2004)
 "Mounamgane Edagamani" - Naa Autograph (2004)
 "Inthe inthinthe inthe inthinthe" - Balu (2005)
 "Jai Jai Ganesa Jai Kodatha Ganesa" - Jai Chiranjeeva (2005)
 "Panchadhara Bomma Bomma" - Magadheera (2009)
 "Desamante Matham Kaadoy" - Jhummandi Naadam (2010)
 "Aakaasam Ammayaithe" - Gabbar Singh (2012)
 "Sai Ante Thalli" - Shiridi Sai (2012)
 "Lali Lali Jo Lali" - Damarukam (2012)
 "Sayonara Sayonara" - 1: Nenokkadine (2014)
 "Jigelu Rani" - Rangasthalam (2018)
 "Ee Sethithone" - Rangasthalam (2018)
 "Naatu Naatu" - RRR (2022)

References

External links

Living people
People from Telangana
Telugu-language lyricists
Indian male songwriters
Telugu playback singers
Indian male playback singers
1978 births
Golden Globe Award-winning musicians
Best Original Song Academy Award-winning songwriters
Indian Academy Award winners